Guido Migliozzi (born 25 January 1997) is an Italian professional golfer. He has three wins on the European Tour. He also competed at the 2020 Summer Olympics.

Professional career
Migliozzi turned professional in 2016. In 2017 and 2018 he played mostly on the Challenge Tour and the Alps Tour. He had little success on the Challenge Tour but won three times on the Alps Tour, once in 2017 and twice in 2018, as well as losing the 2018 Alps de Las Castillas in a three-man playoff.

In November 2018, he finished tied for 13th place in the European Tour Q-School to earn a place on the 2019 European Tour. In March 2019 he won the Magical Kenya Open, his first win on the European Tour and in June 2019 he won the Belgian Knockout, beating Darius van Driel in the final, a result that lifted him into the top-100 of the world rankings.

In March 2021, Migliozzi was a joint runner-up in the Commercial Bank Qatar Masters, one stroke behind Antoine Rozner who won the tournament with a 60-foot putt at the final green. In May, he lost in a playoff at the Betfred British Masters. He was defeated by Richard Bland at the first extra hole. Two weeks later, he finished second at the Made in HimmerLand, five strokes behind Bernd Wiesberger, after a final round 63 in which he birdied four of the last five holes.

Qualifying for his first major championship, the 2021 U.S. Open, he finished tied for 4th, thus earning him exemptions for the 2022 tournament as well as the 2022 Masters Tournament.

In September 2022, Migliozzi won the Cazoo Open de France. He shot a final-round 62 to win by one shot over Rasmus Højgaard, after making a birdie on the final hole at Le Golf National. It was the first birdie of the day on the hole; ranked as the most difficult hole on the European Tour season.

Amateur wins 
 2011 Italian Boys Under 14 Championship
 2012 Italian Under 16 Championship, Italian U18 Stroke Play, Italian U16 International Championship
 2013 Italian U18 (Trofeo Silvio Marazza), Campionato Nazionale Cadetti Trofeo Giovanni Alberto Agnelli, Duke of York Young Champions Trophy
 2014 European Nations Cup Individual, Internationaux de France Juniors Garcons-Trophee Carlhian, Italian Amateur Match Play - Giuseppe Silva Trophy
 2016 Portuguese International Amateur

Source:

Professional wins (6)

European Tour wins (3)

European Tour playoff record (0–1)

Alps Tour wins (3)

Results in major championships

CUT = missed the half-way cut
"T" = tied

Team appearances
Amateur
European Boys' Team Championship (representing Italy): 2012, 2013, 2014, 2015
Eisenhower Trophy (representing Italy): 2014, 2016
Jacques Léglise Trophy (representing the Continent of Europe): 2015 (tied)
St Andrews Trophy (representing the Continent of Europe): 2016 (tied)
European Amateur Team Championship (representing Italy): 2016

Professional
European Championships (representing Italy): 2018
Hero Cup (representing Continental Europe): 2023 (winners)

See also
2018 European Tour Qualifying School graduates

References

External links

Italian male golfers
European Tour golfers
Olympic golfers of Italy
Golfers at the 2020 Summer Olympics
Sportspeople from Vicenza
1997 births
Living people